The 2015 European Speed Skating Championships were held in Chelyabinsk, Russia, from 10 to 11 January 2015.

Sven Kramer won his seventh and Ireen Wüst her fourth championship.

Schedule
The schedule of events:

All times are CET (UTC+1).

Men's championships

Day 1

500 metres

5000 metres

Day 2

1500 metres

10000 metres

Final ranking

Women's championships

Day 1

500 metres

3000 metres

Day 2

1500 metres

5000 metres

Final ranking

See also
 2015 World Allround Speed Skating Championships

References 

European Championships
2015
International speed skating competitions hosted by Russia
Sport in Chelyabinsk
2015 in Russian sport